National Security Strategy may refer to:
 National Security Strategy (India)
 National Security Strategy (United States)
 National Security Strategy (United Kingdom)
 National Security Strategy (Soviet Union)